James Milo Griffith (11 June 1843 – 8 September 1897) was a Welsh sculptor who, after originally training as an artisan mason, became notable for his memorial statues.

Life
Griffith was born in Pont-seli, Pembrokeshire, in 1843. During the restoration of Llandaff Cathedral, undertaken by the Welsh architect John Prichard, Griffith was apprenticed by the Bishop of Llandaff as an artisan stonemason. At the age of twenty, Griffith was admitted to Royal Academy Schools in London.

Griffith produced several works placed on public view, notably on the Holborn Viaduct and Bristol Cathedral. In 1875 his work Summer Flowers was bought by Christopher Rice Mansel Talbot and displayed at Margam Castle. Two of Griffith's most notable works are both publicly displayed statues, one of John Batchelor in Cardiff and the other to Sir Hugh Owen in Caernarfon. Griffith later moved the United States and became a professor of arts in San Francisco. He returned to London in 1896 and died there in 1897. He was buried in the suburb of Morden.

References

1843 births
1897 deaths
19th-century British sculptors
19th-century Welsh male artists
Welsh male sculptors